The Pacific Coast Amateur is an annual amateur golf tournament. It has been played since 1967 and is organized by the Pacific Coast Golf Association. It is held in various locations in the United States and Canada.

In December 2021, the Pacific Coast Amateur joined with six other tournaments to form the Elite Amateur Golf Series.

Host locations

Winners

2022 James Leow
2021 Devon Bling
2020 Canceled
2019 Quade Cummins
2018 Isaiah Salinda
2017 Doug Ghim
2016 Will Zalatoris
2015 Aaron Wise
2014 Corey Pereira
2013 Tyler Raber
2012 David Fink
2011 Chris Williams
2010 Andrew Putnam
2009 Chan Kim
2008 Jordan Irwin
2007 Mike Knight
2006 Patrick Nagle
2005 Alex Prugh
2004 Michael Putnam
2003 James Lepp
2002 Brock Mackenzie
2001 Corey Prugh
2000 Billy Harvey
1999 Ryan LaVoie
1998 Ben Crane
1997 Jason Gore
1996 Scott Johnson
1995 Birk Nelson
1994 Mark Johnson
1993 Todd Demsey
1992 Todd Fischer
1991 David Berganio Jr.
1990 Terrence Miskell
1989 Randy Sonnier
1988 Billy Mayfair
1987 Billy Mayfair
1986 Brian Henninger
1985 Greg Bruckner
1984 Kurt Bosen
1983 Mike Mathies
1982 Tony Grimes
1981 Ron Commans
1980 Brian Haugen
1979 Curt Byrum
1978 Mike Gove
1977 Lindy Miller
1976 Mike Reid
1975 John Fought
1974 Mark Pfeil
1973 Mike Brannan
1972 Mark Pfeil
1971 Jim McLean
1970 Mike Davis
1969 Mike Davis
1968 Ed Morris
1967 Ed Updegraff

References

External links
Official site
List of winners

Amateur golf tournaments in the United States
Amateur golf tournaments in Canada
Recurring sporting events established in 1967